The discography of The Aquabats, an Orange County, California-based rock band, consists of six studio albums, one compilation album, one soundtrack album, two EPs, one live album, one video album and three music videos, among other recordings.

The Aquabats were initially formed as a ska band in 1994 by vocalist The MC Bat Commander, bassist Crash McLarson and trumpeter Catboy. Attracting a significant local cult following for their eccentric music and theatrical stage shows, the band independently recorded and released their debut LP The Return of The Aquabats in 1996, ultimately selling over 24,000 copies without any distribution. After being signed to Goldenvoice Records in 1997, the band released their sophomore album The Fury of The Aquabats! during the height of the American ska revival, becoming their minor mainstream breakthrough, peaking at number 172 on the Billboard 200. The Aquabats' third album, 1999's The Aquabats vs. the Floating Eye of Death!, proved to be a relative commercial disappointment following the band's complete shift in musical direction, resulting in The Aquabats' dismissal from Goldenvoice in 2000.

Despite releasing a B-sides compilation and live DVD through Fearless Records in the early 2000s, The Aquabats spent most of this period in relative inactivity, leading to radical changes in both the band's line-up and musical style. In 2004, the group independently recorded the EP Yo! Check Out This Ride!, signing to Nitro Records several months later. 2005's Charge!!, The Aquabats' first release as a new wave-influenced quintet, effectively revitalized the band's career, meeting with positive reviews and a return to consistent touring. Although plans for a follow-up album were announced in 2007, The Aquabats were dropped from Nitro in 2009, continuing as an independent band before rejoining Fearless in late 2010 to release their fifth studio album, Hi-Five Soup!, which debuted at 181 on the Billboard 200.

In 2019, as the result of a successful Kickstarter campaign to help produce several new albums and the continuation of The Aquabats' live-action television series The Aquabats! Super Show!, the band digitally released their first live album, The Fury of The Aquabats! Live at The Fonda!, as well as a compilation of songs from Super Show!s first season, The Aquabats! Super Show! Television Soundtrack: Volume One, which was later given a wide physical release and debuted at 165 on the Billboard 200, The Aquabats' highest placement on the chart to date. The band's sixth studio album, Kooky Spooky...In Stereo, was released on August 21, 2020 on The Aquabats' own independent label, Gloopy Records.

Albums

Studio albums

Compilation albums

Live albums

Live bootlegs

Extended plays and singles

EPs

Singles
Cassette singles

CD singles

Digital singles

Vinyl singles
From 1998 to 1999, The Aquabats planned to release a series of nine limited edition 7" picture discs, one for each member of the band, featuring an unreleased demo or B-side alongside a track from The Fury of The Aquabats!. Due to Goldenvoice Records' financial constraints at the time, only four of the nine discs were produced.

In July 2017, to coincide with a U.S. tour, The Aquabats released an exclusive 7" single as part of a fan ticket package featuring alternate full-length recordings of two songs from The Aquabats! Super Show!.

Miscellaneous singles

Demos
The following are demo versions and otherwise unreleased recordings of songs released exclusively by The Aquabats.

"Other Rarities" (digital b-sides)
In November 2000, to promote the release of the b-sides compilation Myths, Legends and Other Amazing Adventures, Vol. 2, The Aquabats launched a sub-section of their website providing free downloads of the majority of their then-unreleased demos and rarities dating from 1995 to 1999. The following songs are demos and b-sides that were not previously released on either a demo cassette or compilation:

"Cold Raw Gold"
"Giant Robot Birdhead" [instrumental]
"Green Ghost"
"The Grey Man"
"I Love the Monster"

"The Lonely Horseman"
"Mucho Gusto"
"Return of the British Knight"
"Sequence Erase" [instrumental]
"Todd-1 in Space Mountain Land"

Videography

Music videos

Compilation appearances
The following Aquabats songs were released on compilation albums. This is not an exhaustive list; songs that were first released on the band's albums are not included.

Horchata Records

Horchata Records was the record label owned and operated by The Aquabats from 1994 to 2001.

Named after the beverage of which the Jacobs brothers shared a particular affinity, Horchata Records was originally conceived by Parker Jacobs in the early 1990s for use with his band GOGO13. Though the Horchata label appeared on GOGO13's demo tapes and show posters, it was not made official until 1994 when Christian Jacobs established the Horchata Records LLC to release The Aquabats' early demos. Following The Aquabats' signing to Goldenvoice, Horchata became used for the band's mail order merchandise until 1999, when Parker Jacobs began re-developing it into a branded record label.

According to Parker Jacobs, he had planned to expand Horchata into its own entity, releasing music from bands both real and fictionalized within The Aquabats' universe: "it wasn't a specific sound", Jacobs explained, "but a movement of fun, theatrical bands like The Aquabats and Sandfleas". The official Horchata Records website listed The Aquabats and all of their respective side projects among their roster, including active bands such as GOGO13, The Sandfleas, The Moon Monkeys and Digital Unicorn, as well as either planned or entirely fictional groups like Planet V, Cactus Jack and The She-Goats. Horchata's line-up also included the indie pop band Majestic, surf-punk group The Immortals, new wave band NU-TRA and Utah ska band The Soulutions, though none of these bands would ultimately release material through Horchata. Many of these bands, both real and fictional, were later represented on the 2000 Horchata sampler album Rice Capades.

Following their dismissal from Goldenvoice Records in 2000, The Aquabats entered a period of extended inactivity and limited finances during which it became clear Jacobs' ambitions for Horchata had become unfeasible and the label eventually faded into a state of non-existence in 2001.

The following is a list of releases under the Horchata Records label:

References

Discography
Discographies of American artists
Rock music group discographies